Bhaduri Moshai (Mr. Bhaduri) is a fictional detective character of Bengali poet and novelist Nirendranath Chakraborty. Chakraborty wrote a series of thriller stories of Bhaduri Moshai.

Character 
Bhaduri Moshai is a former Central Bureau of Investigation (CBI) officer. His real name is Charu Chandra Bhaduri. After retirement, Mr. Bhaduri likes to solve mysterious cases privately. He runs a detective agency, Charu Bhaduri Investigation, with headquarters in Bangalore. His assistant,  Kaushik lives in Kolkata. The narrator of all the stories is a relative of Kaushik. One comic character, Sadananda Basu, also joins sometimes with them. Bhaduri Moshai loves to solve crossword puzzles.

Stories 
 Bishangarer Sona
 Pahari Biche
 Kaminir Kanthahar
 Jaal Vejal
 Vor Rater Artonad
 Tusare Rokter Daag
 Angti Rahasya
 Bigraher Chokh
 Bhuture Football

References 

Fictional private investigators
Fictional Indian people
Fictional Bengali people